Rudolf "Rudi" Weinhofer (born 7 May 1962) is an Austrian former footballer who played at both professional and international levels as a midfielder.

Career

Professional career
Weinhofer began his professional career in 1980 with Rapid Vienna, and made over 150 league appearances for the club over the next eight seasons. During the Second Round of the 1984–85 European Cup Winners' Cup, in a match against Scottish side Celtic, Weinhofer claimed to have been hit and injured by an object thrown by Celtic's fans; UEFA ordered the match to be replayed. Rapid progressed at Celtic's expense, and eventually reached the 1985 European Cup Winners' Cup Final – a match which Weinhofer played in – before losing to Everton.

After leaving Rapid in 1988, Weinhofer later played for First Vienna FC, St. Pölten, and Stockerau.

International career
Weinhofer earned four caps for the Austrian national side between 1986 and 1987.

After football
From 2009, Weinhofer worked as a benefits claim checker for the Austrian Health Service.

References

External links

1962 births
Living people
Austrian footballers
Austria international footballers
Austrian Football Bundesliga players
SK Rapid Wien players
First Vienna FC players
SV Stockerau players
SKN St. Pölten players
Association football midfielders